Hajjamine Mosque is a mosque in Tunis, Tunisia, located in the Beb jedid arrondissement. 
The mosque was restored by cheikh El Haj Ahmed Ben Lamine in 1931.

Localization

The mosque can be found in 75 El Hajjamine Street near Bab Jedid, one of the Medina of Tunis doors.

References

Mosques in Tunis